Stick to Your Story is a 1926 American silent action film directed by Harry Joe Brown and starring Billy Sullivan, Bruce Gordon and Melbourne MacDowell. It was distributed by the independent Rayart Pictures, the forerunner of Monogram Pictures.

Synopsis
The film follows the adventures of a cub reporter whose impetuous manner almost gets him fired by his editor.

Cast
 Billy Sullivan as Scoop Martin
 Bruce Gordon as Whipple
 Estelle Bradley as 	Peggy Miles
 Melbourne MacDowell as 	Colonel Miles
 Jack McHugh as Copy O'Hara
 Barney Furey as 	Number Seven
 Harry Semels as Fanatic
 Richard Lewis as 	Reverend Brown

References

Bibliography
 Munden, Kenneth White. The American Film Institute Catalog of Motion Pictures Produced in the United States, Part 1. University of California Press, 1997.

External links
 

1920s American films
1926 films
1920s action films
1920s English-language films
American silent feature films
American action films
American black-and-white films
Films directed by Harry Joe Brown
Rayart Pictures films